The Committee of National Liberation for Northern Italy (CLNAI) was set up in February 1944 by partisans behind German lines in the Italian Social Republic, a German puppet state in Northern Italy. It enjoyed the loyalty of most anti-fascist groups in the region.

History
In Milan, a September 1944 meeting decided a northern National Liberation Committee, within the Italian Social Republic that was established in 1943, was important. National Liberation Committee (CLN) leaders of Rome led by Bonomi recognized in January 1944 the need for coordination of the partisan struggle in the north and then the delegates were Committee of Milan all political and military powers for Upper Italy, despite some disagreement with the Committee of Turin. Directed by independent Alfredo Pizzoni ("Longhi"), the committee became CLNAI Milan (National Liberation Committee for Northern Italy) and the rest of the Resistance led effectively to the partisan struggle in the heart of the Republic of the military and against the Germans.

Members
The initial members of Milan's CLN, which would later become CLNAI were:

 Alfredo Pizzoni, as president
 Girolamo Li Causi and Giuseppe Dozza, representing the Italian Communist Party
 Ferruccio Parri and Vittorio Albasini Scrosati, representing the Action Party
 Roberto Verratti and Domenico Viotto, representing the Italian Socialist Party
 Enrico Casò and Enrico Falck, representing the Christian Democracy
 Giustino Arpesani and Luigi Casagrande, representing the Italian Liberal Party

The composition changed over time. At the time of the general insurrection of 25 April 1945 the members were:

 Roberto Morandi, a Socialist, as president
 Luigi Longo and Emilio Sereni for the Communist Party
 Parri and Leo Valiani for the Action Party
 Sandro Pertini for the Socialist Party
 Augusto De Gasperi and Achille Marazza for the Christian Democracy
 Arpesani and Filippo Jacini for the Liberal Party

Functions
The role of CLNAI grew in importance during the war, after the delegation of powers to the north of Rome CLN obtained by January 31, 1944, last on 26 December 1944 as the government of national unity Bonomi gave the powers of direction in northern Italy to CLNAI, thus effectively assumed the role of "third party government" or "shadow government" in the occupied territories.

Organized as a "government of the great North," the CLNAI managed to maintain cohesion among the different political positions, and maintained the relationship, sometimes difficult, with the Allies. It dealt with the problem of financing the guerrilla warfare (especially tasks undertaken by Pizzoni and Falck) through a network connection with Switzerland. In addition also concluded cooperation agreements with the French Resistance and Yugoslav Resistance.

See also 
ANPI
Anti-fascism
Arditi del Popolo
Giustizia e Libertà
Italian Partisan Republics

References

Further reading
 Alberto Cotti, E-Book: Il Partigiano D’Artagnan, 1994

External links
 ANPI – Associazione Nazionale Partigiani d'Italia
La mappa delle Repubbliche partigiane provides a source for the List of partisan governments
ANPI Section of Rimini
Interviews with Italian partisans
ANPI Section of Pesaro-Urbino
The photographies of the resistance
 ANCFARGL – Associazione Nazionale Combattenti Forze Armate Regolari Guerra di Liberazione 
 INSMLI – Istituto Nazionale per la Storia del Movimento di Liberazione in Italia
 Il portale della guerra di Liberazione
Articles on Anarchist resistance to Italian Fascism
1943–1945: Anarchist partisans in the Italian Resistance
European Resistance Archive
The Life of Basil Davidson by James Currey

Anti-fascist organisations in Italy
Italian Social Republic
World War II resistance movements
1944 in Italy